Lathyrus vestitus is a species of wild pea known by the common name Pacific pea. It is native to western North America, where it is mostly found in the forests, woodlands, and chaparral of California. The ranges of some subspecies extend into Oregon and Baja California. This is a perennial pea vine which varies in appearance across subspecies. Leaves are made up of several leaflets of various shapes up to 4 or 5 centimeters long. The leaves usually bear coiling tendrils and the stipules may be large or small. The inflorescence is a showy array of up to 15 pea flowers, sometimes densely packed together, and usually some shade of bright violet, light to medium purple, or white.

Subspecies
Lathyrus vestitus is often discussed as comprising several varieties.  These are:

Lathyrus vestitus var. alefeldii
Lathyrus vestitus var. ochropetalus
Lathyrus vestitus var. vestitus

External links

Calflora Database: Lathyrus vestitus (Bolander's pea,  Canyon Sweet Pea, Common pacific pea, Pacific peavine)
Jepson Manual eFlora (TJM2) treatment of Lathyrus vestitus
USDA Plants Profile

UC CalPhotos gallery: Lathyrus vestitus

vestitus
Flora of Baja California
Flora of California
Flora of Oregon
Natural history of the California chaparral and woodlands
Natural history of the California Coast Ranges
Natural history of the Channel Islands of California
Natural history of the Peninsular Ranges
Natural history of the Santa Monica Mountains
Natural history of the Transverse Ranges
Flora without expected TNC conservation status